Burana is a village in the Chüy Region of Kyrgyzstan. Its population was 772 in 2021. It is most famous for the Burana Tower and the associated ruins of Balasagun located near it.

References

Populated places in Chüy Region